The Caucasian snow vole (Chionomys gud) is a species of rodent in the family Cricetidae.

It is found in Georgia, Russian Federation, and Turkey.

Its natural habitats are temperate forests and temperate grassland.

References

Musser, G. G. and M. D. Carleton. 2005. Superfamily Muroidea. pp. 894–1531 in Mammal Species of the World a Taxonomic and Geographic Reference. D. E. Wilson and D. M. Reeder eds. Johns Hopkins University Press, Baltimore.

Chionomys
Vole, Caucasian Snow
Mammals described in 1909
Taxa named by Konstantin Satunin
Taxonomy articles created by Polbot